Villanuova sul Clisi is a comune in the province of Brescia, in Lombardy, Italy. It is situated on the left bank of the river Chiese, known locally as Clisi. As of 2011 Villanuova sul Clisi had a population of 5,837.

Sister city
Villanuova sul Clisi is twinned with:
 Trébeurden, France, since 2000.

References

Cities and towns in Lombardy